FC Khimik Meleuz was a Russian football team from Meleuz. It played professionally for one season in the Russian Third League in 1994..

External links
  Team history at KLISF

Association football clubs established in 1993
Association football clubs disestablished in 1995
Defunct football clubs in Russia
Sport in Bashkortostan
1993 establishments in Russia
1995 disestablishments in Russia